The Secondary School Certificate (SSC) or Secondary School Leaving Certificate (SSLC), Matriculation examination, is a public examination in Bangladesh, India and Pakistan conducted by educational boards for the successful completion of the secondary education exam in these countries. Students of 10th grade/class ten can appear in these. It is equivalent to the year 10 of the GCSE in England or the first two years of high schools in United States.

Bangladesh
Secondary School Certificate is a public examination in Bangladesh conducted by the Boards of Intermediate and Secondary Education under the Ministry of Education. One has to pass the JSC Examination in order to participate. SSC is held based on the books of classes 9 and 10, which are usually the same. To pass, a student has to undergo both a written and a practical exam.

Students of religious and English medium streams also sit for their respective public examinations, Dakhil and O-Level, conducted by the Madrasah Education Board, Cambridge International Examinations (CIE) and Pearson Edexcel under the board of British Council, as well as other curriculums such as International Baccalaureate, respectively to qualify for further education.

SSC or equivalent is mandatory in order to get admitted into colleges and later, universities. Usually, it is held between the months of February and March every year.

India

The Secondary School Certificate (SSC) or Secondary School Leaving Certificate (SSLC) is a certification obtained by the High School Students upon the successful completion of a Secondary Examination at the end of study at the Secondary School Level in India. The SSC or SSLC is obtained on passing the “Class 10th Public Examination” which is commonly referred to as “Class 10th Board Examinations” in India. The SSC is also known as Matriculation in many states of india.

Pakistan
Secondary School Certificate is a public exam for classes 9 and 10 separately. Class 9 exam is called SSC part-1 and class 10 exam is called SSC part-2. This exam is conducted by government boards, officially known as Boards of Intermediate and Secondary Education, or simply BISE. Provincial boards conduct the exams at provincial level and Federal Board of Intermediate and Secondary Education conducts the exams at federal level. Every province has its own boards stationed in main districts of the provinces. Exams are held usually in March & April. Groups include Science group & Arts/Humanities group at SSC level. In the early 2000s, Computer Science was added as an option in place of Biology, and that is the only option Science students can opt for. Upon clearing both the SSC Part-1 and SSC Part-2 examinations, students are awarded with the official secondary school certification (SSC) qualification.

See also
Matriculation
Junior School Certificate (JSC)
Higher Secondary (School) Certificate (HSC)
General Certificate of Secondary Education (GCSE)
GCE Ordinary Level
Cambridge International Examinations (CIE)
Board examination

References

School qualifications of Pakistan
School qualifications of India